James Tibbits Willmore  (Birmingham September 180012 March 1863 London) was a British engraver.

Biography
He was born at Bristnal's End, Handsworth (then Staffordshire, now West Midlands). Contemporaneous authorities differ on the spelling of his middle name, as seen in the citations below.

His father, James Willmore, was a manufacturer of silverware. At the age of fourteen Willmore was apprenticed to  the Birmingham engraver William Radclyffe. His younger brother Arthur Willmore (1814–1888) trained with him, and also became an engraver. Radclyffe had received drawing lessons in Birmingham from Joseph Barber. He married, and in 1823 he went to London where he worked for Charles Heath for three years.  He later worked on the plates of William Brockedon's Passes of the Alps and Turner's England and Wales.

He made engravings after Chalon, Leitch, Stanfield, Landseer, Eastlake, Creswick and Ansdell, and especially after Turner. Willmore engraved thirteen pictures on copper for Turner's England and Wales series, beginning in 1828, and eight on steel for his Rivers of France. He made a number of large single plates after Turner, including Ancient Italy in 1842.  The next year he exhibited  this print at the Royal Academy (the first he had shown there), and was elected an associate engraver of the academy.

He died on 12 March 1863 and is buried on the western side of Highgate Cemetery.

Gallery

References

External links
 

 Willmore's engraving of J. M. W. Turner's view of Nantes from Feydeau Island was published in The Keepsake annual for 1831, with an illustrative poem entitled  by Letitia Elizabeth Landon.

1800 births
British engravers
People from Handsworth, West Midlands
People from Birmingham, West Midlands
1863 deaths
Burials at Highgate Cemetery
Associates of the Royal Academy